Plant perception or biocommunication is the paranormal idea that plants are sentient, that they respond to humans in a manner that amounts to ESP, and that they experience a range of emotions or parapsychological states. Since plants lack nervous systems, paranormal claims regarding plant perception are considered pseudoscience by the scientific community.

Such paranormal claims are distinct from the ability of plants to sense and respond to the environment via chemical and related stimuli.

Early research

In 1811, James Perchard Tupper authored An Essay on the Probability of Sensation in Vegetables which argued that plants possess a low form of sensation. He has been cited as an early botanist "attracted to the notion that the ability of plants to feel pain or pleasure demonstrated the universal beneficence of a Creator".

The notion that plants are capable of feeling emotions was first recorded in 1848, when Gustav Fechner, an experimental psychologist, suggested that plants are capable of emotions and that one could promote healthy growth with talk, attention, attitude, and affection.

Jagadish Chandra Bose began to conduct experiments on plants in the year 1900. Bose invented various devices and instruments to measure electrical responses in plants. He stated from his experiments that an electrical spasm occurs during the end of life for a plant.

According to biologist Patrick Geddes "In his investigations on response in general Bose had found that even ordinary plants and their different organs were sensitive— exhibiting, under mechanical or other stimuli, an electric response, indicative of excitation." One visitor to his laboratory, the vegetarian playwright George Bernard Shaw, was intensely disturbed upon witnessing a demonstration in which a cabbage had "convulsions" as it boiled to death.

In 1900, ornithologist Thomas G. Gentry authored Intelligence in Plants and Animals which argued that plants have consciousness. Historian Ed Folsom described it as "an exhaustive investigation of how such animals as bees, ants, worms and buzzards, as well as all kinds of plants, display intelligence and thus have souls".

Later research
In the 1960s Cleve Backster, an interrogation specialist with the CIA, conducted research that led him to believe that plants can communicate with other lifeforms. Backster's interest in the subject began in February 1966 when he tried to measure the rate at which water rises from a philodendron's root into its leaves. Because a polygraph or 'lie detector' can measure electrical resistance, which would alter when the plant was watered, he attached a polygraph to one of the plant's leaves. Backster stated that, to his immense surprise, "the tracing began to show a pattern typical of the response you get when you subject a human to emotional stimulation of short duration".

In 1975, K. A. Horowitz, D. C. Lewis and E. L. Gasteiger published an article in Science giving their results when repeating one of Backster's effects - plant response to the killing of brine shrimp in boiling water. The researchers grounded the plants to reduce electrical interference and rinsed them to remove dust particles. As a control three of five pipettes contained brine shrimp while the remaining two only had water: the pipettes were delivered to the boiling water at random. This investigation used a total of 60 brine shrimp deliveries to boiling water while Backster's had used 13. Positive correlations did not occur at a rate great enough to be considered statistically significant. Other controlled experiments that attempted to replicate Backster's findings have also produced negative results.

Botanist Arthur Galston and physiologist Clifford L. Slayman who investigated Backster's claims wrote:

There is no objective scientific evidence for the existence of such complex behaviour in plants. The recent spate of popular literature on "plant consciousness" appears to have been triggered by "experiments" with a lie detector, subsequently reported and embellished in a book called The Secret Life of Plants. Unfortunately, when scientists in the discipline of plant physiology attempted to repeat the experiments, using either identical or improved equipment, the results were uniformly negative. Further investigation has shown that the original observations probably arose from defective measuring procedures.

John M. Kmetz noted that Backster had not used proper controls in his experiments. When controls were used, no plant reactions to thoughts or threats were observed.

The television show MythBusters also performed experiments (Season 4, Episode 18, 2006) to verify or disprove the concept. The tests involved connecting plants to a polygraph galvanometer and employing actual and imagined harm upon the plants or upon others in the plants' vicinity. The galvanometer showed a reaction about one third of the time. The experimenters, who were in the room with the plant, posited that the vibrations of their actions or the room itself could have affected the polygraph. After isolating the plant, the polygraph showed a response slightly less than one third of the time. Later experiments with an EEG failed to detect anything. The show concluded that the results were not repeatable, and that the theory was not true.

See also 

 Plant rights
 The Secret Life of Plants
 Harold Saxton Burr
 List of parapsychology topics

References

Further reading

Cusack, Anne E; Cusack, Michael J. (1978). Plant Mysteries: A Scientific Inquiry. Messner. 
Galston, Arthur W. (1974). The Unscientific Method. Natural History 83: 18–24. 
Galston, Arthur W. (1975). The Limits of Plant Power. Natural History 84: 22–24.
Galston, Arthur W; Slayman, Clifford L. (1979). The Not-So-Secret Life of Plants: In Which the Historical and Experimental Myths About Emotional Communication Between Animal and Vegetable Are Put to Rest. American Scientist 67 (3): 337–344.
Horowitz, K. A., Lewis, D. C, and Gasteiger, E. L. (1975). Plant 'Primary Perception': Electrophysiological Unresponsiveness to Brine Shrimp Killing. Science 189: 478–480.
Kmetz, John M. (1977). A Study of Primary Perception in Plants and Animal Life. Journal of the American Society for Psychical Research 71 (2): 157–170. 
Kmetz, John M. (1978). Plant Primary Perception: The Other Side of the Leaf. Skeptical Inquirer 2 (2): 57–61.
Carroll, Robert Todd. (2003). Plant Perception (a.k.a. The Backster Effect). Accessed 30 Nov 2006.
Mescher, Mark C; Moraes, Consuelo M. De. (2015). The Role of Plant Sensory Perception in Plant–Animal Interactions. Journal of Experimental Botany 66: 425–433.
Stone, Robert. (1994). The Secret Life of Your Cells. Whitford Press.

External links 
 Plant Perception - Skeptic's Dictionary.
 Plants cannot "think and remember," but there's nothing stupid about them: They're shockingly sophisticated - Scientific American.
The Intelligent Plant - The New Yorker. 
No, plants don't have feelings - The Week.

Paranormal terminology
Plants
Pseudoscience